Rupert Probst (born 30 July 1981) is an Austrian former road cyclist.

Major results
2007
 1st  National Time Trial Championships
 5th National Road Race Championships
2009
 3rd GP Kooperativa
 7th Rund um Köln
 7th Raiffeisen Grand Prix
2010
 4th National Road Race Championships
 6th Raiffeisen Grand Prix

References

External links

1981 births
Living people
Austrian male cyclists